Szaniec Landscape Park (Szaniecki Park Krajobrazowy) is a protected area (Landscape Park) in south-central Poland, covering an area of .

The Park lies within Świętokrzyskie Voivodeship: in Busko County (Gmina Busko-Zdrój, Gmina Solec-Zdrój, Gmina Stopnica), Kielce County (Gmina Chmielnik) and Pińczów County (Gmina Pińczów, Gmina Kije).

Szaniec
Parks in Świętokrzyskie Voivodeship